Edwin Mordant (December 22, 1868 - February 16, 1942) was an actor on stage and in films in the United States. He appeared in numerous shows between 1901 and the later 1920s.

He was married to Ola Humphrey. They divorced. The ‘’New York Dramatist’’ published a photo of him.

Theater
‘’The Fatal Wedding’’ (1901)

Filmography
The Seven Sisters (1915) as Baron Rodviany
A Royal Family (1915)
The Prince and the Pauper (1915)
Poor Little Peppina (1916) as Robert Torrens 
Molly Make-Believe (1916) as Mr. Wendell
The Undying Flame (1917) as The King
The Cost (1920) as Colonel Gardner
County Fair (1937) as Mr. Brooks, Moon Glow's Owner
Outlaws of Sonora (1938) as Banker Pierce 
Shadows Over Shanghai (1938) as Dr. Adams

References

1868 births
20th-century American male actors
1942 deaths
American male silent film actors
American male film actors
American male stage actors
Male actors from Baltimore
Burials at Hollywood Forever Cemetery
Male actors from Hollywood, Los Angeles
American male Shakespearean actors